Yingpan is a town on the coast of the South China Sea in Tieshangang District, Beihai, Guangxi, People's Republic of China.

Towns of Guangxi
Beihai